Ken Mitsuda (29 April 1902 – 28 November 1997) was a Japanese film actor. He appeared in 53 films between 1940 and 1983.

Selected filmography
 Snow White and the Seven Dwarfs (Grumpy) (voice Japanese version)
 Lady and the Tramp (Jock) (voice Japanese version)
 An Inlet of Muddy Water (1953)
 Sansho the Bailiff (1954)
 The Bad Sleep Well (1960)
 Enraptured (1961)
 Battle of the Japan Sea (1969)
  Shōsetsu Yoshida Gakkō (1983) - Kijūrō Shidehara

References

External links

1902 births
1997 deaths
Japanese male film actors
Male actors from Tokyo
20th-century Japanese male actors